The 2011 Canadian federal election was held on May 2, 2011, to elect members to the House of Commons of Canada of the 41st Canadian Parliament.

The writs of election for the 2011 election were issued by Governor General David Johnston on March 26. Prime Minister Stephen Harper advised the Governor General to dissolve parliament after the House of Commons passed a motion of non-confidence against the government, finding it to be in contempt of Parliament. A few days before, the three opposition parties had rejected the minority government's proposed budget.

The Conservative Party remained in power, increasing its seat count from a minority to a majority government, marking the first time since 1988 that a right-of-centre party formed a majority government. The Liberal Party, sometimes dubbed the "natural governing party", was reduced to third party status for the first time as they won the fewest seats in its history, and party leader Michael Ignatieff was defeated in his riding. The Bloc Québécois lost official party status for the first time since contesting general elections in 1993. Party leader Gilles Duceppe was defeated in his riding and subsequently resigned as leader. The New Democratic Party led by Jack Layton won the largest number of seats in its history, enabling it to form the Official Opposition for the first time in the party's history, as they made a major breakthrough in Quebec. The Green Party elected its first member to the House of Commons with its leader, Elizabeth May, becoming MP for Saanich—Gulf Islands.

Background

The 2008 federal election resulted in the continuation of the incumbent Conservative minority government, headed by Stephen Harper. The 40th Parliament was marked by two controversial prorogations: the first in December 2008 which ended an attempted opposition coalition, and the second a year following, which prompted public protests. Following the first prorogation, Michael Ignatieff and the Liberal Party provided support for the government of Prime Minister Stephen Harper. On August 31, 2009, the Liberals withdrew their backing but the NDP under Jack Layton abstained and the Conservatives survived the confidence motion.
Ignatieff's attempt to force a September 2009 election was reported as a miscalculation, as polls showed that most Canadians did not want another election. Ignatieff's popularity as well as that of the Liberals dropped off considerably immediately afterwards.

In 2011, Elections Canada laid charges against the Conservative Party, alleging contraventions of the Canada Elections Act five years earlier. This issue, along with the Bloc Québécois announcing its intention to vote against the budget, unless it contained numerous changes including $2 billion in compensation to Quebec for harmonizing PST and GST and funding for a new NHL arena in Quebec City, increased the speculation that there would be an election called soon as the Conservatives rejected the Bloc demands as "blackmail".

On March 9, 2011, Speaker of the House of Commons Peter Milliken ruled that Bev Oda, a minister of the Crown, and, separately, the Cabinet itself could both possibly be in contempt of parliament, the latter for its ongoing refusal to meet opposition requests for details of proposed bills and their cost estimates. Milliken directed both matters to committee and set as the deadline for its report March 21, 2011, one day before the budget was to be tabled. The committee found the government to be in contempt of Parliament. The vote divided along party lines, with the governing but minority Conservative members of Parliament (MPs) opposing the finding and issuing a dissenting report. After the committee released its findings, opposition leader and head of the Liberal Party Michael Ignatieff proposed a motion of no confidence against the Crown-in-Council and, on March 25, 2011, the House of Commons voted on the motion, the majority agreeing, by a margin of 156 to 145, with the committee's conclusions. A cabinet being found in contempt of parliament was without precedent in Canada or any other Commonwealth country. Earlier that week, all three opposition parties had indicated that they would oppose the government's budget; the NDP said that the concessions that the Conservatives made did not go far enough.

Campaign slogans

The parties' campaign slogans for the 2011 election:

 Bloc Québécois: "Parlons Québec" (Let's talk about Quebec)
 Conservative Party: "Here For Canada / Ici pour le Canada". In francophone Quebec, Harper ran under the slogan "Notre région au pouvoir" (Our Region in Power).
 Green Party: "It's Time" & "Canada needs Elizabeth May but only you can elect her"
 Liberal Party: "Rise Up Canada" & "Change we need, from a proven team." The first one refers to Harper's contempt charge. The second one was used after the NDP's surge in the opinion polls, making reference to the fact that it has never formed a federal government.
 New Democratic Party: "Working For Families / Travaillons ensemble", "You have a choice", and "That's Canadian Leadership"

Timeline

Issues

Election campaign

Controversies and gaffes

A number of controversies took place during the election campaign.

Leaders' debates

The English- and French-language debates took place on April 12 and 13 respectively.

On March 29, the consortium of broadcasters playing host to the debates (the CBC, CTV, Global, Radio-Canada and TVA) announced that it would only invite the leaders of the four recognized parties in the House of Commons, namely, the Conservative Party, the Liberal Party, the Bloc Québécois and the New Democratic (NDP). Therefore, the Green Party was excluded, despite earning 6.8 per cent of the popular vote in the 2008 federal election.

On March 30, Stephen Harper challenged Michael Ignatieff to a one-on-one televised debate. Although Ignatieff accepted the challenge, this was opposed by the other opposition parties. The idea was later rejected by the broadcast consortium and cancelled.

On April 1, comedian Rick Mercer suggested over Twitter hosting a one-on-one debate between Stephen Harper and Michael Ignatieff at Toronto's Massey Hall. He later added he would donate $50,000 to the charities of their choosing if they were willing to participate. Ignatieff immediately accepted the challenge and named the Alzheimer Society as his charity of choice, as his mother succumbed to Alzheimer's disease in 1992. Harper did not respond to the challenge.

In an interview with The Globe and Mail published on April 1, Troy Reeb, the broadcast consortium chairman, discussed the process behind setting up the leaders' debates and the rationale for various decisions made, including the decision to exclude the Green Party's leader Elizabeth May.

On April 5, the Federal Court rejected the Green Party's request for an expedited hearing on the matter prior to the scheduled debates.

On April 10, the date of the French leaders debate was changed from April 14 to 13 due to worries of broadcasting conflicts with the NHL playoffs scheduled for April 14. Also on April 10, Elizabeth May participated in a panel interview on CHCH-TV in Hamilton, which she was invited to attend, as were the leaders of the Bloc, Liberals, New Democrats and Conservatives, by Channel Zero, whose president was disappointed by May's exclusion from the leaders' debates.

Small parties public forum
A joint press conference and public forum was staged by 11 of the 18 registered parties and one unregistered party on April 23, 2011, at York University.  Forum organizers invited the leaders from all registered political parties who do not have seats in parliament. Parties were able to explain their platforms and responded to questions from the audience.  As a forum, the goal was an inter-party discussion of major issues, however some debate did occur.

Participants in the forum were the Animal Alliance Environmental Voters, the Canadian Action Party, the Christian Heritage Party, the Communist Party, the First Peoples National, the Libertarian Party, the Marijuana Party, the Marxist–Leninist Party, the Rhinoceros Party, and the Pirate Party.

Green Party leader Elizabeth May refused to participate in the forum claiming they are not one of "the small, fringe parties".

Opinion polls

New Democratic Party surge
In the week before the leaders debate, on April 8, a poll showed the New Democratic Party (NDP) support at 13.2%.
A reversal of fortune began on April 16, when an Angus Reid poll indicated a tie in support for the NDP and the Liberals, both polling at 25%. The New Democrats' poll numbers then moved significantly ahead of the Liberals and slightly or moderately behind the Conservatives.

The surge began in Quebec, with the NDP surprising many observers by surpassing the previously front-running Bloc in Quebec. In the entirety of Canada, the NDP surged past the Liberals to take the second place behind the Conservatives; in Quebec, the NDP took first place. The NDP surge became the dominant narrative of the last week of the campaign, as other parties turned their attacks on the party. Ruth Ellen Brosseau, the NDP candidate in Berthier—Maskinongé, won despite not running a campaign, barely speaking French at this time  and being on holiday in Las Vegas at the time of the election. The NDP's rise in popularity was nicknamed "Orange Crush", an allusion to the soft drink with the same name and the party's colour. It was also nicknamed the "Orange Wave".

Election spending
Pre-campaign, there are no limits to what a political party, candidate, or third party can spend — spending rules are only in force once the writ is dropped and the campaign has officially begun.

Spending limits for the 2011 federal election

Election spending during the 2011 federal election

Endorsements

Most major newspapers endorsed the Conservatives, and none solely endorsed the Liberals or Greens. Canada's highest circulated newspaper, the Toronto Star, endorsed the NDP but also advised readers to vote against the Conservatives.

Candidates by party
Articles on parties' candidates for the 41st election:

Results

|- style="text-align:center;background-color:#e9e9e9"
! rowspan="2" colspan="2" style="text-align:left;" | Party
! rowspan="2" style="text-align:left;" | Party leader
! rowspan="2" style="font-size:80%;" | Candidates
! colspan="5" | Seats
! colspan="4" | Popular vote
|- style="text-align:center;background-color:#e9e9e9"
| 2008
| style="font-size:80%" | Dissol.
| 2011
| style="font-size:80%" | % Change
| % seats
| #
| style="font-size:80%" | # Change
| %
| style="font-size:80%" | pp Change
|-

| style="text-align:left;" | Stephen Harper
| 307 || 143 || 143 || 166 || +16.08% || 53.90% || 5,835,270 || +626,201 || 39.63% || +1.98pp

| style="text-align:left;" | Jack Layton
| 308 || 37 || 36 || 103 || +178.38% || 33.44% || 4,512,411 || +1,997,123 || 30.65% || +12.47pp

| style="text-align:left;" | Michael Ignatieff
| 3081 || 77 || 77 || 34 || −42.86% || 11.04% || 2,783,076 || −850,109 || 18.90% || −7.36pp

| style="text-align:left;" | Gilles Duceppe
| 75 || 49 || 47 || 4 || −91.84% || 1.30% || 891,425 || −488,566 || 6.05% || −3.92pp

| style="text-align:left;" | Elizabeth May
| 304 || — || — || 1 ||  || 0.32% || 572,095 || −365,518 || 3.89% || −2.89pp

| colspan=2 style="text-align:left;" |Independent and No Affiliation
| 61 || 2 || 2 || — || −100% || — || 72,861 || −21,983 || 0.49% || −0.19pp

| style="text-align:left;" | James Hnatiuk
| 46 || — || — || — || — || — || 18,910 || −7,565 || 0.13% || −0.06pp

| style="text-align:left;" |Anna Di Carlo
| 70 || — || — || — || — || — || 9,925 || +1,360 || 0.07% || +0.01pp

| style="text-align:left;" |Dennis Young
| 23 || — || — || — || — || — || 6,002 || −1,298 || 0.04% || −0.01pp

| style="text-align:left;" | Sinclair Stevens
| 9 || — || — || — || — || — || 5,790 || −70 || 0.04% || —
2
| style="text-align:left;" | François Gourd
| 14 || — || — || — || — || — || 3,800 || +1,678 || 0.03% || +0.01pp

| style="text-align:left;" | Mikkel Paulson
| 10 || * || — || — || * || — || 3,197 || * || 0.02% || *

| style="text-align:left;" | Miguel Figueroa
| 20 || — || — || — || — || — || 2,894 || −678 || 0.02% || −0.01pp

| style="text-align:left;" | Christopher Porter
| 12 || — || — || — || — || — || 1,951 || −1,504 || 0.01% || −0.01pp

| style="text-align:left;" | Blair Longley
| 5 || — || — || — || — || — || 1,756 || −542 || 0.01% || —

| style="text-align:left;" | Liz White
| 7 || — || — || — || — || — || 1,344 || +817 || 0.01% || +0.01pp

| style="text-align:left;" | Doug Christie
| 4 || — || — || — || — || — || 751 || +326 || 0.01% || —

| style="text-align:left;" |Brian Jedan
| 3 || * || — || — || * || — || 293 || * || 0.00% || *

| style="text-align:left;" | Will Morin
| 1 || — || — || — || — || — || 229 || −1,382 || 0.00% || −0.01pp

| colspan=4 style="text-align:left;" | Vacant
| 3
| style="text-align:center;" colspan="7" |  
|- style="background-color:#e9e9e9;"
! style="text-align:left;" colspan="3" | Total
! 1,587
! 308
! 308
! 308
! ±0.0%
! 100.0%
! 14,723,980
! +886,286
! 100%
!  
|-
| style="text-align:left;" colspan="13" | Source: Elections Canada

1. André Forbes of Manicouagan was nominated as a Liberal, but lost party support after being nominated, and continued to run as an independent; he is listed here as a Liberal rather than an independent, as he was listed as a Liberal on the ballot.
2. The Rhinoceros Party contested the previous federal election under the name Neorhino.ca.
3. People's Political Power Party of Canada failed to run candidates in the 2011 election and was deregistered by Elections Canada on April 13, 2011.

The voter turnout was 61.1%.

Pairing off the top three parties, percentage of seats swung between the parties can be calculated as:

 Conservative to NDP: 5.24%
 Liberal to Conservative: 4.66%
 Liberal to NDP: 9.90%

Results by province

Post-election

Overview of results

With an overall voter turnout of 61.4% and 14,823,408 ballots cast, the Conservative Party remained in power, moving from a minority to a majority government by winning 166 of the 308 seats.  The New Democratic Party won the largest number of seats in their history, including a large majority of seats in Quebec (where they had previously only ever elected two candidates) and formed the Official Opposition for the first time. The Liberal Party won the fewest seats in their history and party leader Michael Ignatieff was defeated in his own riding. The Bloc Québécois, which had always won at least a majority of seats in Quebec in every election of their existence, lost nearly all their seats, and thus also their official party status, including the seat of their leader Gilles Duceppe. Green Party leader Elizabeth May became the first Member of Parliament elected to represent the party.

Recounts
Elections Canada ordered three judicial recounts, and an elector initiated a fourth. The Canada Elections Act states that "a judicial recount is required when the difference in votes between the first- and second-place candidates is less than one one-thousandth of the total votes cast in a riding," and allows an elector or candidate in any riding to approach a judge and request a recount regardless of the final result. In all four ridings, Etobicoke Centre, Montmagny—L'Islet—Kamouraska—Rivière-du-Loup, Nipissing—Timiskaming, and Winnipeg North, the validated result was confirmed:
As initially validated by election officials, Conservative Party candidate Ted Opitz defeated Liberal incumbent Borys Wrzesnewskyj in Etobicoke Centre by 25 votes, a margin increased by one in the recount. Citing potential voter registration irregularities, however, Wrzesnewskyj has sought to have the result overturned by the courts, filing a formal motion with the Ontario Superior Court in spring 2012. On October 25, 2012, the Supreme Court of Canada upheld Opitz's narrow victory.
Initially, Conservative Jay Aspin defeated incumbent Anthony Rota of the Liberal Party by 15 votes in Nipissing—Timiskaming; the recount added three votes to the margin of victory.
In Montmagny—L'Islet—Kamouraska—Rivière-du-Loup, incumbent Conservative MP Bernard Généreux was initially declared re-elected, but due to a counting error on election night, the seat was later determined to have been won by the NDP candidate François Lapointe by a margin of five votes. The recount confirmed Lapointe as the winner by nine votes.
In Winnipeg North, a recount was requested by an elector; the difference between Liberal Kevin Lamoureux, the victor, and New Democrat Rebecca Blaikie was just 45 votes, reduced by one vote in the recount.

Opposition party leadership changes
Ignatieff announced on May 3, 2011, that he would step down as leader of the Liberal Party when it chose his successor. Ignatieff took a teaching position at the University of Toronto after his defeat in Etobicoke—Lakeshore. He decided to teach classes in the law faculty, the department of political science, the Munk School of Global Affairs and the School of Public Policy and Governance. Ignatieff stated that, "The life that I like the best is teaching. It's the end of my life as a politician". Bob Rae, Liberal MP for Toronto Centre and former Premier of Ontario (1990 to 1995, as a New Democrat), subsequently became interim leader of the Liberal Party, with a Liberal leadership election which took place April 14, 2013, during which Justin Trudeau was chosen as leader.

Duceppe resigned as Bloc Québécois leader on election night following his defeat. Louis Plamondon, MP for Bas-Richelieu—Nicolet—Bécancour and Dean of the House, subsequently became interim parliamentary leader of the Bloc. Former MP Daniel Paillé, who lost his seat in the election, won the Bloc leadership election to succeed Duceppe on December 11, 2011.

On July 25, 2011, Jack Layton took a leave of absence to fight a newly diagnosed cancer. Nycole Turmel, former union leader and newly elected MP for Hull—Aylmer, was named interim leader of the New Democratic Party. On August 22, Layton died. Turmel became opposition leader. A leadership election was held on March 24, 2012, and Tom Mulcair was elected leader of the New Democratic Party.

Controversies
The losing parties in the Berthier—Maskinongé riding claimed that the nomination papers for Ruth Ellen Brosseau, the newly elected NDP Member of Parliament for the riding, had irregularities. Some of the alleged irregularities include writing an address instead of signing, missing signatures, people thinking they were signing a petition for the NDP to name a candidate in the riding and one person not remembering that he signed her nomination papers even though he admitted that the signature looks like his. The NDP denied the allegations. Elections Canada has insisted that Brosseau's nomination papers were legitimate. Elections Canada stated that "The decision to overturn or uphold the results is at the discretion of the courts and not Elections Canada".

The Liberal Party of Canada attracted controversy regarding the past racist comments and White supremacist history of one of its candidates in northern Quebec, Andre Forbes. His history as a white supremacist activist and past hate speech against Muslims, First Nations and LGBTQ+ people was uncovered by the NDP.  Liberal leader Michael Ignatieff immediately removed Forbes as a candidate.

Voter suppression scandal

In early 2012, there were allegations of voter suppression during the election, starting the robocall scandal. Elections Canada and the Royal Canadian Mounted Police (RCMP) investigated claims that robocalls were used in an attempt to dissuade voters from casting their ballot by telling them their poll stations had changed location. While the Elections Canada investigation initially focused on calls sent into Guelph amidst nationwide complaints, the investigation continued to expand in scope and to examine complaints in other ridings across the country. Reports of fraudulent automated or live calls targeting opposition supporters were published in 100 ridings and Elections Canada acknowledged it was investigating telephone election fraud complaints in 247 of Canada's 308 federal ridings.

On March 27, 2012, the Council of Canadians announced that they had launched a lawsuit in the Federal Court of Canada to ask for by-elections to be ordered in seven ridings where complaints were received and where Conservatives had won by slim margins. The ridings named were Don Valley East, Winnipeg South Centre, Saskatoon-Rosetown-Biggar, Vancouver Island North, Yukon, Nipissing-Timiskaming and Elmwood-Transcona. The case was heard over two weeks starting December 9, 2012. Justice Richard G. Mosley ruled in May 2013 that fraud had occurred in Guelph and that voting irregularities and misconduct occurred in all six of the contested ridings, but that it was not significant enough to warrant overturning the election results. The judge also ruled that the mostly likely source of the fraud was the Conservative Party of Canada's (using the CIMS database) and that there was no evidence that its use was approved by the CPC.

In April 2013, a criminal charge in the matter was laid on Michael Sona, a former Conservative staffer who was the communications officer and official Ottawa liaison for the Guelph Conservative campaign. In August 2014, he was convicted of the charge.

Riding of Vaughan

In a further scandal, Elections Canada was called on to investigate the finances of Associate Minister of National Defence Julian Fantino's election finances after three former Conservative riding executives from Vaughan signed affidavits alleging impropriety in Fantino's 2010 and 2011 election campaigns. They alleged there was a second, secret, illegal bank account containing $300,000.

Commentary 
Pundits in the wake of the 2011 election widely believed in a theme of major political realignment. The Economist said, "the election represents the biggest realignment of Canadian politics since 1993." Lawrence Martin, commentator for The Globe and Mail, claimed that "Harper has completed a remarkable reconstruction of a Canadian political landscape that endured for more than a century. The realignment sees both old parties of the moderate middle, the Progressive Conservatives and the Liberals, either eliminated or marginalized." Writing for Maclean's, Andrew Coyne proclaimed "The West is in and Ontario has joined it," observing that the Conservatives achieved their majority predominantly due to strength in both Ontario and the western provinces (an electoral combination that was historically unlikely due to the low population of the latter); this, he argued, marked "the new axis of Canadian politics", and that "the Conservatives are now in a position to replace the Liberals as the natural governing party in Canada." Books such as The Big Shift by John Ibbitson and Darrell Bricker, and Peter C. Newman's When the Gods Changed: The Death of Liberal Canada,  provocatively asserted that the Liberals had become an "endangered species" and that an NDP-led opposition would mean that "fortune favours the Harper government" in subsequent campaigns. However, the resurgence of the Liberal Party in the 2015 election has since challenged that narrative.

See also

2011 Bloc Québécois leadership election
Controversies in the Canadian federal election, 2011
2013 Liberal Party of Canada leadership election
List of Canadian federal general elections
List of political parties in Canada
Newspaper endorsements in the Canadian federal election, 2011
Results of the 2011 Canadian federal election

Notes

References

Further reading

External links

 Elections Canada
 CBC News – Canada Votes 2011